Jason Robinson (born September 20, 1975) is an American jazz saxophonist and academic.

Early life and education
Born in Northern California, Robinson was raised in the Sierra Nevada region. He attended the University of Southern California for one year before earning a Bachelor of Arts degree in jazz studies and philosophy from Sonoma State University. Robinson later earned a Master of Arts and PhD in music from the University of California, San Diego.

Career 
Robinson was mentored by the bassist Mel Graves, who also recorded on From the Sun, Robinson's first album as a leader. He was a member of the groups Cannonball and Groundation, and founded Circumvention Music.

In San Diego, he worked extensively with a trio that featured bassist Rob Thorsen and drummer Brett Sanders.

Robinson has developed long-term collaborative groups, including Cosmologic and Trummerflora. In 2002, Robinson's album Tandem, a series of duos, was released. He has music at Amherst College; the University of California, San Diego; the University of California, Irvine; Southwestern College; Cuyamaca College; and San Diego City College.

Discography

As leader
 From the Sun (Circumvention, 1998)
 No Stars Please with Trummerflora (Accretions, 2001)
 Tandem (Accretions, 2002)
 Fingerprint (Circumvention, 2007)
 Eyes in the Back of My Head with Cosmologic (Cuneiform, 2008)
 Cerberus Rising (Circumvention, 2009)
 The Two Faces of Janus (Cuneiform, 2010)
 Cerulean Landscape with Anthony Davis (Clean Feed, 2010)
 Cerberus Reigning (Accretions, 2010)
 Tiresian Symmetry with JD Parran, Marcus Rojas, Liberty Ellman (Cuneiform, 2012)
 Resonant Geographies (pfMENTUM, 2018)

As sideman
With Groundation
 Each One Teach One (Young Tree, 2001)
 Hebron Gate (Young Tree, 2002)
 Dub Wars (Young Tree, 2005)
 Upon the Bridge (Young Tree, 2006)
 Here I Am (Naive, 2009)
 A Miracle (Soulbeats, 2014)

With others
 B-Side Players, Radio Afro-Mexica (Global Noize, 2009)
 Anthony Davis, Tania (Koch, 2001)
 Marty Ehrlich, A Trumpet in the Morning (New World, 2013)
 Hans Fjellestad, Dual Resonance (Circumvention, 2003)

References

External links
 Jason Robinson official website
 "Amherst College visiting professor Jason Robinson offers a multi-site, real-time collaborative concert", Valley Advocate, April 2, 2009

American jazz tenor saxophonists
American male saxophonists
Free jazz saxophonists
American jazz composers
American male jazz composers
Free jazz composers
American electronic musicians
1975 births
Living people
Avant-garde jazz composers
Avant-garde jazz saxophonists
21st-century American saxophonists
21st-century American male musicians
Sonoma State University alumni
University of California, San Diego alumni
University of California, San Diego faculty
University of California, Irvine faculty
Amherst College faculty